Biser Georgiev can refer to:

 Biser Georgiev (water polo) (born 1953), Bulgarian Olympic water polo player
 Biser Georgiev (wrestler) (born 1973), Bulgarian Olympic wrestler